A Happy Man is a 2009 Canadian-French comedy-drama directed by Robert Ménard. 
It was entered into several film festivals including the Rhode Island International Film Festival. Moreover, it was chosen Best Foreign Film at the New York Independent Film Festival in 2009.
The film is also known as A Happy Man.

Plot
French professor Pierre Martin is a widower who lives with his single daughter Catherine. When his aunt Jeanne dies she bequeathers him her guest house in Canada on condition he lives there for a minimum of time. He loves to comply because he has fond childhood memories of this place. In order to make his daughter Catherine accompany him he tells her a great deal of money was also part of Jeanne's heritage. So both of them hurry  to the rural little town Sainte Simone du Nord in Canada. The mayor Michel Dolbec knows Jeanne's house will become property of their community if the two Martins don't hold out long enough. He sabotages them several times but they stay. Eventually Pierre Martin and Michel Dolbec become friends after all.

Cast

Reception
The film received mixed reviews. It was praised as a "touching politically incorrect comedy". Yet its narrativity been blamed for a lack of rigour.

DVD release
A NTSC version of Le Bonheur de Pierre has been released on DVD in winter 2009.

References

External links
 
 
 
 

2009 films
Films directed by Robert Ménard
Canadian comedy-drama films
French comedy-drama films
French-language Canadian films
2000s Canadian films
2000s French films